Michi may refer to:

People
Given name
Michi (born 1996), Japanese J-pop singer
MiChi (born 1985), British singer
Michi Atkins, former WNBA basketball player
Michi Beck (born 1967), DJ and MC of the German hip hop group Die Fantastischen Vier 
Michi Gaigg (born 1957), Austrian violinist and conductor
Michi Go (born 1988), South Korean singer-songwriter, rapper, record producer, entrepreneur and fashion icon
, Japanese football player
Michi Halilović (born 1983), German skeleton racer of Bosnian origin
Michi Hayböck (born 1991), Austrian ski jumper
, Japanese animation artist and character designer
Michi Itami (born 1938), visual artist
Michi Muñoz (born 1981), Mexican-born American professional boxer
Michi Takahashi (born 1963), Japanese teddy bear artist
Michi Weglyn (1926-1999), author of the book Years of Infamy: The Untold Story of America’s Concentration Camps

Surname
Maria Michi (1921–1980), Italian actress

Other uses
"Michi" (Exile song), 2007
"Michi" (Chisato Moritaka song), 1990
"Michi" (Hikaru Utada song), 2016
Michi, a Japanese language spelling of Dō (道, "way", refer to Dō)

Germanic given names
Japanese feminine given names